Great Indian Railway Journeys is a British television documentary series presented by Michael Portillo, in which he travels on the railway networks of India, referring to a 1913 copy of Bradshaw’s Handbook Of Indian, Foreign And Colonial Travel, as he visits various destinations throughout India.

Episodes

Series 1 (2018)

References

External links
 

2018 British television series debuts
2018 British television series endings
2010s British documentary television series
2010s British travel television series
BBC television documentaries
BBC travel television series
Documentary television series about railway transport
English-language television shows
Television series by Fremantle (company)
Television shows set in India